Orange Record Label was a Canadian independent record label, located in Toronto, Ontario, Canada. Orange recordings were distributed in Canada by Universal Music Canada, which was also a minority stakeholder in the label.

Orange is also used to record and distribute the songs featured on the Instant Star television series starring Alexz Johnson.  Stephen Stohn, executive Producer of Instant Star, is also a minority stakeholder and director of Orange.

Orange also plays host to the Live @ Orange Sessions which are recorded in the Orange Lounge Recording Studio for webcasting on Bell Sympatico.  Orange's distribution arm, Starcana Distribution, facilitates the national distribution of independent labels and artists. 
Artists who have performed in Live @ Orange Sessions include Katy Perry, Alexz Johnson, All American Rejects, Hedley, Pussycat Dolls, OneRepublic, Nelly Furtado, Creed, Emily Osment, Chris Cornell, Amy Winehouse, Keith Urban, Sugarland, The Fray, and Colbie Caillat.

Orange Record Label is directly linked to The Orange Lounge Recording Company, the active record label home to artists such as Justin Hines and Ash & Bloom, and holds the catalogues of Alexz Johnson, Johnny Hollow, Tyler Kyte, and Robyn Dell’Unto.

Former Orange artists 
 Paul Brandt
 Jim Bryson
 Johnny Hollow
 Jakalope
 Billy Klippert
 Chris Koster
 Tyler Kyte
 Maestro
 Melissa McClelland
 Money Money
 Louise Pitre
 Tara Slone

See also 
 List of record labels

References

External links
 Orange Record Label Official site
 The Orange Lounge Official site

Record labels established in 1969
Canadian independent record labels
Pop record labels
Rock record labels
Companies based in Toronto